Raghavendra usually refers to Raghavendra Tirtha (1595–1671), a Hindu saint

Raghavendra may also refer to:

Arts and entertainment
Raghavendra stotra, hymn composed by Appanacharya in praise of Raghavendra Tirtha
Sri Raghavendrar, 1985 Tamil film directed by S. P. Muthuraman about Raghavendra Tirtha
Raghavendra (film), 2003 Tollywood film directed by Suresh Krishna

People
Kovelamudi Raghavendra Rao (born 23 May 1942), director in Telugu cinema
Raghavendra Rajkumar, actor in the Karnataka, India, film industry
Raghavendra Gadagkar, professor at the Centre for Ecological Sciences, Indian Institute of Science in Bangalore

Other
Raghavendra Matha, a Madhva Matha based in Mantralayam